Ali Chukson is a populated place and census designated place in Pima County, Arizona, United States. Its population was 113 as of the 2020 census. It is not to be confused with another village on the reservation, Ali Chuk.

Demographics

References

Census-designated places in Pima County, Arizona